Kit Chan (born 15 September 1972) is a Singaporean singer and actress.

Early life and education
Born on 15 September 1972 in Singapore, Chan is the third daughter in a family of four sisters.

Chan studied in Fairfield Methodist School, Raffles Girls' School, Raffles Junior College and Lasalle-SIA College of the Arts. During Chan's six-year hiatus from the music scene from 2004 to 2010, she returned to LaSalle as a mature student. She wrote a thesis on the psychology of performance and graduated with first-class honors.

Entertainment career
Since her debut in 1993, Chan has worked in singing, theatre, television drama, poetry, song-writing, entrepreneurship and creative direction. In 1994, Chan released the album Heartache (心痛) into the Taiwanese market. She subsequently released more albums regionally including Liking You (喜欢你), Dazzling (炫耀), and Worried (担心), performing in parts of Asia, the United States, Korea, and New Zealand, as well as collaborating with symphonies and orchestras in Hong Kong, Taiwan and Singapore.

Chan performed a song, Home, during the 1998 Singapore National Day Parade which became very popular in Singapore. It was subsequently performed in various editions of the National Day Parades.

Chan took a hiatus in 2004 from her performing career to further her studies and joined international PR consultancy Hill & Knowlton as a campaign specialist in 2007. She worked on the Ministry of Defence's 2009 Total Defence campaign, 'What Will You Defend?'. She left the company after 19 months.

Chan has also worked linguistically and theatrically, with her Cantopop, and English albums. She has held lead roles in the Hong Kong musical Snow.Wolf.Lake with Jacky Cheung – both the Cantonese version in 1997 and the Mandarin production in 2005 – followed by The Legend (where she played the late Teresa Teng), and Forbidden City: Portrait of An Empress (where she played the young Empress Dowager Cixi)– first performed in 2002 as part of the Esplanade's opening programme, and again in 2003. Chan has also played the lead in the Dutch-Hong Kong production of East Meets West, and the Taiwanese musical What's Love Got to Do with It?.

In September 2006, she reprised her role again in Forbidden City: Portrait of an Empress, as part of a plan to make this musical internationally recognised, in the hope of going on a world tour. Chan later fronted the first Singapore Day in New York City in 2007. After her corporate sojourn, Chan performed the commissioned theme song One World at the APEC 2009 Gala Night and returned the theatre as leading lady (Li Qing) in the Mandarin musical December Rains (雨季) at Esplanade Theatre in 2010. In the same year, she sang Home for the third time at the National Day Parade. Chan was also a member of the cast of the television drama Healing Hands II, the sequel to TVB's medical drama Healing Hands in 2000. She was the female lead in SPH MediaWorks Channel U's drama serial Cash is King. Chan also acted in the 2010 film Lover's Discourse.

In 2011, Chan released her first studio album Re-interpreting Kit Chan (重譯 陳潔儀) since 2004 and staged two solo concerts in collaboration with the Singapore Chinese Orchestra at Esplanade Concert Hall, as the anchor performance of the Huayi Chinese Festival of Arts 2011. In the same year, she held her three-night solo concert The Music Room at the Marina Bay Sands Grand Theater. Also in 2011, Chan worked with Nexus, Ministry of Defence as Creative Director for the Total Defence "Home – Keeping It Together" Campaign 2011. She was also executive producer for the remake of the Home MV, which featured 39 local artistes spanning different genres, eras and races, including Max Surin, Dick Lee, Taufik Batisah, JJ Lin, and Stefanie Sun. She wrote the theme song 倔强 for the MediaCorp Channel 8 anniversary drama Devotion, which won Best Drama Theme Song award at the 2012 Star Awards. Concerts themed An Enchanted Evening with Chiu Tsang Hei (傾城) were also held in Hong Kong.

In 2014, Chan performed in her first leading film role in Jason Lai's Miss J Contemplates Her Choice as the titular Miss J, who offers advice to callers on a radio talk show. The film premiered at the Singapore International Film Festival in December. In 2014, Chan reportedly underwent a surgical procedure that left her barely able to speak, however she completed her 'Spellbound' concert eventually in 2015 at Star Theatre. She also participated China reality singing contest I Am A Singer where Chinese critic Deng Ke remarked that Kit Chan can't sing. She announced her retirement from performing at the National Day Parades in 2015 after making her last NDP performance. In 2015, she sang the theme song for Channel 8 Blockbuster The Dream Makers II.

In July 2016, she released her first album of original material in 12 years, titled The Edge of Paradise (天堂边缘). In September, Chan ended her Spellbound concert tour with a finale at Singapore Indoor Stadium to a 7,000-strong audience.

In 2018, Chan marked her 25th anniversary as a singer with an acoustic live sessions album in which she also penned the lyrics for the title track “A Time for Everything”. She also staged “25 Years On: A Time For Everything” concerts in Singapore and Taipei.

Chan has published a collection of her English poems, Cork out of my Head, in 2000 in Taiwan, I Write a Page in 2000 in Singapore, and a fiction book (together with her friend, Siew Fern Yong) titled Cathy and Jodie: The Princess and the Flea.

In 2022, Chan performed in The LKY Musical, where she performed as the late Madam Kwa Geok Choo, the wife of Singapore’s founding Prime Minister Lee Kuan Yew.

Community involvement
In 1998, Chan was appointed as the first National Youth Ambassador for Singapore's National Youth Council. She served for two years. From 2001 to 2005, she served as a council member with the National Youth Council. In 2002 the Commonwealth Youth Programme Asia Centre awarded her an Award for Excellence in Youth Work.

In 2007, Chan was appointed to the board of the National Heritage Board over a two-year period, reaching out to the Singapore audience and linking with the creative industries.

She is also the ambassador to the Christian relief organization "World Vision".

Business ventures
Chan has invested in two boutiques in Singapore, Flowers in the Attic and Roses in the Loft.

In 2010, Chan set up her own record label, named after her singing group Banshee Empire from when she was in secondary school.

Personal life
On 8 December 2012, Chan married her long-time boyfriend, who was a finance director and known only as Han, whom she first met in 2000. The couple had since divorced in 2017.

Discography

Stage

Filmography

Film

Television series

Web series

Awards and nominations

Star Awards

References

External links
 
 KitChan.com
 Kit Cat Club (official fan club)
 
Kit Chan on Instagram

1972 births
Living people
Raffles Junior College alumni
Singaporean people of Cantonese descent
Singaporean composers
21st-century Singaporean women singers
Singaporean Mandopop singers
TVB actors
Singaporean expatriates in Hong Kong
Cantopop singers
Raffles Girls' Secondary School alumni
20th-century Singaporean women singers
LASALLE College of the Arts alumni
Singaporean born Hong Kong artists